The National Monuments of Bosnia and Herzegovina include:
sites, places, immovable and movable heritage of historical and cultural importance, as designated by the Commission to preserve national monuments of Bosnia and Herzegovina on the basis of Annex 8 to the Dayton Agreement; and
world heritage sites in accordance to the UNESCO World Heritage Convention.

Below is the comprehensive list composed of Cultural-Historical National Monuments of Bosnia and Herzegovina and World Heritage Sites in Bosnia and Herzegovina.

This list is based on the commission's old website now maintained as an archive, which contains comprehensive data-base with Decision list, Petition list, Provisional and Tentative list, maps, images, together with other documents, descriptions, criteria and laws of all country's monuments, candidate monuments, rejected monuments, as well as those removed from list of protected properties, with browsable documents archive at:
Archive – Commission's old website maintained as an archive – in English (also available in Bosnian/Croatian/Serbian).

Also, both old (archive) and new website maintains many other information and documents, the criteria, laws, news on activities, virtual exhibitions, galleries, etc., all browsable at:

New website – Commission to preserve national monuments – in English;
also available in Bosnian/Croatian/Serbian – choose language here: Commission – Language;
Archive – Commission to preserve national monuments – old website maintained as an archive, available in Bosnian/Croatian/Serbian and English.

For the UNESCO criteria see the Selection criteria.

Natural heritage sites and the tentative list of World Heritage Sites of Bosnia and Herzegovina are not included, instead these are elaborated within scope of separate lists, along with other specific lists created on the basis of monuments category, type or subject.

List of inscribed World Heritage Sites

List of monuments

See also
List of World Heritage Sites in Bosnia and Herzegovina
List of fortifications in Bosnia and Herzegovina

References

N
N
N
N